Terri Funk Sypolt (born December 14, 1953) is an American politician who has served in the West Virginia House of Delegates from the 52nd district since 2016.

Current committee assignments
 Natural Resources
 Committee on Fire Departments and Emergency Medical Services
 Government Organization
 Senior, Children, and Family Issues
 Veterans Affairs and Homeland Security

References

1953 births
Living people
Republican Party members of the West Virginia House of Delegates
Politicians from Morgantown, West Virginia
21st-century American politicians
21st-century American women politicians
Women state legislators in West Virginia